The UK Albums Chart is one of many music charts compiled by the Official Charts Company that calculates the best-selling albums of the week in the United Kingdom. Since 2004 the chart has been based on the sales of both physical albums and digital downloads. Since 2015, the album chart has been based on both sales and streaming. This list shows albums that peaked in the top ten of the UK Albums Chart during 2022, as well as albums which peaked in 2021 and 2023 but were in the top 10 in 2022. The entry date is when the album appeared in the top 10 for the first time (week ending, as published by the Official Charts Company, which is six days after the chart is announced).

Two-hundred and eight albums were in the top 10 this year. Twelve albums from 2021 remained in the top ten for several weeks at the beginning of the year, while Christmas by Michael Bublé, originally released in 2011, re-entered the chart in 2021, but did not reach its peak until 2023. Between Us by Little Mix was the only album from 2021 to reach its peak in 2022. 

The first new number-one album of the year was Dawn FM by The Weeknd. Overall, thirty-seven different albums peaked at number-one in 2022, with thirty-seven unique artists hitting that position.

An asterisk (*) in the "Weeks in Top 10" column shows that the album is currently in the top 10.

Background

Chart debuts
The following table (collapsed on desktop site) does not include acts who had previously charted as part of a group and secured their first top 10 solo album.

Best-selling albums
Harry Styles had the best-selling album of the year with Harry's House. = by Ed Sheeran came in second place. Taylor Swift's Midnights, The Highlights by The Weeknd and Olivia Rodrigo's Sour made up the top five. Albums by Eminem, Elton John, Fleetwood Mac, Little Mix and ABBA were also in the top ten best-selling albums of the year.

Top-ten albums
Key

Entries by artist
The following table shows artists who have achieved two or more top 10 entries in 2022, including albums that reached their peak in 2021. The figures only include main artists, with featured artists and appearances on compilation albums not counted individually for each artist. The total number of weeks an artist spent in the top ten in 2022 is also shown.

See also
List of UK Albums Chart number ones of the 2020s

References
General

Specific

External links
2022 album chart archive at the Official Charts Company (click on relevant week)

United Kingdom top 10 albums
Top 10 albums
2022